Aaron Hinman Grout (January 18, 1879 – December 29, 1966) was an American judge and political figure who served as Secretary of State of Vermont.

Early life
Grout was born in Rock Island, Illinois, on January 18, 1879. He was the son of Governor Josiah Grout and Harriet Hinman Grout. He was also the nephew of Congressman William W. Grout.

Grout was raised in Derby and Newport, Vermont, and graduated from Derby Academy in 1896.

Military service
In 1893, he joined the National Guard. Enlisting in Company I, 1st Vermont Infantry Regiment as a private, he attained the rank of corporal before receiving his commission as a captain and serving as an aide to brigade commander Brigadier General Julius J. Estey. During the Spanish–American War, he aided Estey in organizing and mustering the National Guard soldiers who made up the unit federalized as the 1st Vermont Volunteer Infantry Regiment. He left the National Guard in 1901.

Start of career
Grout graduated from the University of Vermont in 1901, studied law with Newport attorney John W. Redmond, and attained admission to the bar in 1904.  He practiced in Newport, first as an associate of the firm Young and Young, and later in partnership with his father. A Republican, Grout served as a messenger in the Governor's office during his father’s term in office, 1896 to 1898. During the governorship of Fletcher D. Proctor (1906–1908), he was the governor's executive clerk. He served as Secretary of Civil and Military Affairs (chief assistant) to Governor George H. Prouty (1908 to 1910).

Grout was chairman of the Orleans County Republican Convention in 1908, a delegate to the Republican state convention in 1908 and 1910, and president of the Newport Republican Club in 1908 and 1910.
From 1912 to 1916, Grout served as Orleans County State’s Attorney, a position previously held by his uncles Theophilus and William Grout.

Continued military service
During his service on Governor Prouty's staff, Grout also served as Prouty's military secretary with the rank of major, and he continued his military service after 1910 as the Judge Advocate of the Vermont National Guard.

During World War I, he was a lieutenant colonel in the Vermont Volunteer Militia, the home guard organization formed to handle the National Guard's domestic missions while its soldiers were deployed overseas.

Later career
Grout served in the Vermont House of Representatives from 1921 to 1923. In 1923, the Secretary of State, Harry A. Black, died in office. Grout was appointed to fill the vacancy. He was elected to a full two-year term in 1924, and was re-elected in 1926. He served as Secretary of State from the time of his appointment in April 1923 until resigning in May 1927.

Grout resigned as Secretary of State to relocate to Burlington and become Treasurer and Manager of the Vermont Acceptance Corporation, a company that made loans to finance the purchase of homes, automobiles and other items.

From 1933 to 1941, Grout was Judge of Burlington's Municipal Court. In 1948, he was elected to a term in the Vermont Senate.

Civic memberships
Grout was a member of the Congregational church. He was a member of the Grange and the Memphremagog Yacht Club, president of the Burlington Rotary Club and a member of the Kappa Sigma fraternity.

Grout was an active member of the Masons. He attained the 33rd Degree of the Scottish Rite, and served as Vermont's Masonic Grand Master.

Death and burial
Grout died in Burlington on December 29, 1966. He is buried at Lakeview Cemetery in Burlington.

Family
In 1907, Grout married Edith Goddard Hart of Chelsea, Massachusetts. Their children included daughters Eleanor (1911–1937) and Nancy (1913–1987).

Other
Grout's home at 370 Main Street in Burlington was built in 1881. It is still standing, and has gone through several owners and remodelings. Since 2000, it has been operated as the Lang House Bed & Breakfast.

References

1879 births
1966 deaths
University of Vermont alumni
Vermont lawyers
State's attorneys in Vermont
Republican Party members of the Vermont House of Representatives
Republican Party Vermont state senators
Secretaries of State of Vermont
American Freemasons
Politicians from Rock Island, Illinois
People from Newport (city), Vermont
Politicians from Burlington, Vermont
American militia officers
American military personnel of the Spanish–American War
American military personnel of World War I
Burials at Lakeview Cemetery (Burlington, Vermont)
Vermont National Guard personnel
Military personnel from Illinois